Jacob Leicht may refer to:
 Jake Leicht, American football halfback
 Jacob Leicht (politician), American farmer and politician in Wisconsin